The women's 48 kilograms (Extra lightweight) competition at the 2010 Asian Games in Guangzhou was held on 16 November at the Huagong Gymnasium.

Wu Shugen of China won the gold medal.

Schedule
All times are China Standard Time (UTC+08:00)

Results

Main bracket

Repechage

References

Results

External links
 
 Draw

W48
Judo at the Asian Games Women's Extra Lightweight
Asian W48